Alucita kosterini is a moth of the family Alucitidae. It is found on the highlands of the Zeravshanskii Ridge in Tajikistan.

The wingspan is 13–14 mm. The ground colour of the adults is grey, with a vague, very uncontrasted pattern. Adults have been recorded in May.

References

Moths described in 1999
Alucitidae
Moths of Asia